Rankovci (or Ferencfalva) is a village in the Municipality of Tišina in the Prekmurje region of northeastern Slovenia.

Notable people
Notable people that were born or lived in Rankovci include:
 Feri Kühar (1916–1945), the first sculptor from Prekmurje

References

External links
Rankovci on Geopedia

Populated places in the Municipality of Tišina